Alex Kendellen (born 3 March 2001) is an Irish rugby union player for Munster in the United Rugby Championship and Champions Cup. He plays in the back-row and represents UCC in the All-Ireland League.

Early life
Born in Cork, Kendellen attended Presentation Brothers College and captained the school to the final of the 2020 Munster Schools Rugby Senior Cup, scoring two tries in their 33–10 semi-final win against Limerick school St Munchin's College, though the final against Cork rivals Christian Brothers College was cancelled and the cup shared due to the COVID-19 pandemic.

Munster
Having already won representative honours with Munster under-18s and under-19s, Kendellen joined the Munster academy immediately upon leaving school in June 2020. He made his senior competitive debut for Munster in their 2020–21 Pro14 round 15 match against Welsh side Scarlets on 12 March 2021, coming on as a 28th minute replacement for the injured Fineen Wycherley in Munster's 28–10 win, and made his Champions Cup debut for Munster in their 2021–22 pool B round 2 fixture at home to French club Castres on 18 December 2021, coming on as a replacement for John Hodnett in the province's 19–13 win.

Kendellen made his first start for Munster in their 10–8 away defeat against provincial rivals Connacht in round 9 of the 2021–22 United Rugby Championship on 1 January 2022, and scored his first try for the province one week later in their 18–13 home win against Ulster. For his performances during the 2021–22 season, Kendellen won Munster's John McCarthy Award for Academy Player of the Year when the province's end-of-season awards were announced in June 2022.

Kendellen joined Munster's senior squad on a two-year contract from the 2022–23 season, and extended that contract by a further year in September 2022, meaning Kendellen will remain with the province until at least July 2025. He featured off the bench in Munster's historic 28–14 win against a South Africa XV in Páirc Uí Chaoimh on 10 November 2022.

Ireland
Kendellen represented the Ireland Schools team at the under-18 Six Nations Festival in 2018, and captained the side at the same tournament in 2019. He has also played for the Ireland under-18 Sevens team. He received his first call up to the Ireland 7s team ahead of the International Rugby 7's tournament at St George's Park, England in May 2021, where they played hosts Great Britain and the United States.

Kendellen was selected to captain the Ireland under-20s team at the 2021 Six Nations Under 20s Championship when the squad was announced on 10 June 2021, scoring a try and earning the player of the match award in Ireland's opening 38–7 win against Scotland on 19 June. Kendellen followed up his opening round exploits with another try and strong performance in Ireland's 40–12 win against Wales on 25 June, before a 24–15 defeat against England on 1 July brought an end to Ireland's winning start in the tournament. Looking to get back to winning ways, Ireland suffered a scare against Italy on 7 July, trailing 23–12 at half-time, before two tries from player of the match Kendellen sparked a second-half comeback for a 30–23 Irish victory. In Ireland's final game of the tournament, Kendellen scored two tries in his sides 34–28 defeat against France on 13 July, finishing the tournament with six tries in five games and two player of the match awards, having featured in all but 22 minutes of Ireland's campaign.

Kendellen was selected in the Emerging Ireland squad that travelled to South Africa to participate in the Toyota Challenge against Currie Cup teams Free State Cheetahs, Griquas and Pumas in September–October 2022, however, he was ruled out of the tour due to concussion and returned to Munster to complete the mandatory return-to-play protocols.

Honours

Presentation Brothers College
Munster Schools Rugby Senior Cup:
Winner (1): 2020

Individual
Munster Academy Player of the Year:
Winner (1): 2011–22

Notes

References

External links
Munster Senior Profile
Munster Academy Profile
URC Profile

2001 births
Living people
People educated at Presentation Brothers College, Cork
Rugby union players from Cork (city)
Irish rugby union players
Cork Constitution players
University College Cork RFC players
Munster Rugby players
Ireland international rugby sevens players
Rugby union flankers
Rugby union number eights